Kungliga patrasket is a 1945 Swedish drama film directed by Hasse Ekman. Ekman was inspired by his father, Gösta Ekman and the Barrymore family.

Plot summary
The film circles around the Anker family who are all actors work together at Stefan Ankers theatre, Kungsteatern, in Stockholm. 
But different complications threaten to break up the happy union between three generations of Ankers, how will it end?

Cast
Edvin Adolphson as Stefan Anker, actor and theatre manager
Ester Roeck-Hansen as Elisabet "Betty" Anker, his wife
Hasse Ekman as Tommy Anker, his son
Eva Henning as Monica Anker, his daughter
Olof Winnerstrand as Karl-Hugo Anker, his father
Hilda Borgström as Charlotta Anker, his mother
Gudrun Brost as Sonja Swedje, his star
Erik Strandmark as Göran Wallsenius, Monicas husband
Stig Järrel as Stridström, author 
Hugo Tranberg as Ernst 
Bengt Ekerot as Rolf Eriksson, actor
Wiktor "Kulörten" Andersson as Mille

External links

1945 films
Films directed by Hasse Ekman
1940s Swedish-language films
Films set in Stockholm
Swedish black-and-white films
Swedish comedy-drama films
1945 comedy-drama films
1940s Swedish films